Richard von Frankenberg (4 March 1922 in Darmstadt – 11 November 1973 in Beilstein) was a German journalist and race car driver.

In 1952 he created and published the (later) official Porsche magazine Christophorus (magazine). The visuals of the magazine were created by graphic artist Erich Strenger.For many years he remained editor-in-chief.

He took part in many 24 Hours of Le Mans in the 1950s, as well as in races at Mille Miglia, Montlhery, Monza and Nürburgring, often with a Porsche 550, the type of car he became famous for, when crashing over the banking of the AVUS in Berlin. The Porsche slid over the top and Frankenberg was thrown out, which was caught on photos like this one. He survived with minor injuries – unlike Jean Behra who was killed in a similar accident in 1959.

Frankenberg was killed in a roadway accident in 1973 at age 51.

References

External links
 Richard von Frankenberg biography 

1922 births
1973 deaths
German male journalists
German racing drivers
24 Hours of Le Mans drivers
Sportspeople from Darmstadt
Racing drivers from Hesse
Road incident deaths in Germany
World Sportscar Championship drivers
German male writers
20th-century German journalists

12 Hours of Reims drivers
Porsche Motorsports drivers